KMQ may refer to:

 Komatsu Airport, an airport in the city of Komatsu, Japan
 KMQ viewer, glasses for viewing a stereoscopic over/under format